The Tumut railway station is a heritage-listed former railway station and railway staff accommodation and now private houses located on the Cootamundra-Tumut and Kunama line in Tumut, in the Snowy Valleys Council local government area of New South Wales, Australia. It is also known as the Tumut Railway Station group. The property was added to the New South Wales State Heritage Register on 2 April 1999.

Description 
The complex compromises a type 16 timber pioneer station building that was completed in 1903. The station master's type 7, J3 timber residence adjoins the station, with a lamp room and WC and corrugated iron curved roof was also completed in 1903. A goods shed, comprising a  side shed with awning and corrugated iron

Heritage listing 
Tumut station is a good example of a pioneer station with some remnants of the former yard. Despite losing the platform face, the building is in good condition and is one of the few pioneer buildings to survive in the State. The other elements support the main building, particularly the residence which is one of the best surviving example of this style of residence. All the elements of the group are in excellent condition and are very good examples of a pioneer station complex. The building has a prominent place in the town of Tumut and is important in the history of the town and the area as the construction of the railway was a major achievement.

Tumut railway station was listed on the New South Wales State Heritage Register on 2 April 1999 having satisfied the following criteria.

The place possesses uncommon, rare or endangered aspects of the cultural or natural history of New South Wales.

This item is assessed as historically rare. This item is assessed as arch. rare. This item is assessed as socially rare.

See also 

List of railway stations in New South Wales

References

Attribution

External links

New South Wales State Heritage Register
Tumut
Disused regional railway stations in New South Wales
Houses in New South Wales
Articles incorporating text from the New South Wales State Heritage Register
Railway stations in Australia opened in 1903